Maria Theresia Löw (27 March 1809 – 30 December 1885) was a German operatic soprano and harpist. She was born in Heidelberg, Germany.

A childhood friend of Richard Wagner, she first appeared at the Court Theatre in Kassel under the conductor and composer Louis Spohr. She married heldentenor Karl-August Lehmannde. Their daughters Lilli Lehmann and Marie Lehmann also became soprano singers. After separating from her husband about 1853, she took care of their vocal training. In addition to her daughters, she trained the voices of other singers of her era, working at the German Theatre in Prague where she lived from 1853.

Her uncle (father of her brother)  from Speyer was knighted by the Bavarian government. His daughter Amalie Löw married the politician . She died on 30 December 1885 at the age of 86 in Berlin.

Publications
 Lilli Lehmann: Meine Gesangskunst. Berlin, 1902.
  Lilli Lehmann: Main Leben. Leipzig 1913, Neudruck 1977.

References 

1809 births
1885 deaths
German operatic sopranos
German harpists
19th-century German women opera singers